Alan Cohen is an American Chief Executive Officer working in creative and media industries.

Early life and education
Cohen grew up in Philadelphia, Pennsylvania. He completed his bachelor's degree in communications from Boston University and received an MBA from Harvard Business School.

Career

NBC
Cohen started his career working at General Electric and NBC from 1982 to 1996 where he was promoted to be the most senior marketing executive at NBC and led initiatives including the network’s first online and new media ventures.

American Broadcasting Company
At The Walt Disney Company Cohen served as the EVP Marketing from 1996 to 2002 where he oversaw all marketing, advertising and promotions for American Broadcasting Company and its properties. Cohen launched the “one-channel” initiative and was responsible for the ABC yellow brand.

20th Century Fox
Next, Cohen went to 20th Century Fox to serve as President of Marketing and oversee the launches for titles such as Ice Age, Unfaithful and Minority Report. Ice Age was the first successful animated film for the studio.

IPG Initiative
From 2004 to 2008, Cohen went to advertising agency IPG Initiative as President of the company, which grew from 80 employees to over 300 in his time there.

OMD
At Omnicom Group Cohen became the longest serving head of any US media agency, from 2008 to 2013. While at Omnicom, Cohen hired an additional 500 employees, doubled revenue and tripled profits, leading Advertising Age and Adweek to award OMD “Agency of the Year” 5 times in 6 years.

Giant Spoon
Cohen then went on to become co-founder in Giant Spoon, an advertising agency which he helped lead from 2013 to 2016.

Personal
Cohen lives in New York City.

References

Living people
Boston University College of Communication alumni
Harvard Business School alumni
Year of birth missing (living people)
American chief executives